Roy William Hill (December 1, 1899 – February 14, 1986)  was an automobile dealer, philanthropist, and early trustee and benefactor of Eisenhower Medical Center.

Early years
Hill was the son of Maurice C. Hill, a sheet metal worker, and Bulah A. Hill.

Career

Hill spent 25 years with General Motors, initially in Dallas, a period in which promotions and assignments sent him to various U.S. cities. He rose to be Dallas Regional Manager for Chevrolet and testified for the company in a 1939 antitrust suit. He resigned to establish his own retail automobile business and extended the business to nine Texas cities, New Mexico and California. In 1964, the Custom Tailors Guild of America named Hill as one of America's ten best-dressed men, along with Chicago Mayor Richard J. Daley.

Eisenhower Medical Center
Hill was among the early trustees of Eisenhower Medical Center and was elected concurrently with Martha Hyer. He subsequently participated in the raising of more than a million dollars for the Medical Center.

Death
Hill died in Rancho Mirage, California in 1986, and is buried in Desert Memorial Park.

References

1899 births
1986 deaths
Burials at Desert Memorial Park
Businesspeople from California
General Motors former executives
20th-century American philanthropists
20th-century American businesspeople